During the 1998–99 Dutch football season, AFC Ajax competed in the Eredivisie.

Season summary
Having waltzed to the title during the previous season, Ajax suffered a complete collapse this season to finish 6th, 23 points adrift of champions Feyenoord. This was the club's lowest finish since 1965. The club also suffered poor form in Europe, finishing bottom of their Champions League group stage. Manager Morten Olsen had paid for the club's poor form in December with his job; his replacement, promoted reserve-team coach Jan Wouters, was unable to reverse the team's fortunes but managed to lead Ajax to win the KNVB Cup.

Players

First-team squad

Left club during season

Jong Ajax

Transfers

In
  Wamberto -  Standard Liège, August
  Georgi Kinkladze -  Manchester City, £5,000,000
  Jesper Grønkjær -  AaB, £3,500,000, July

Out
  Edwin van der Sar -  Juventus, approx. £5,000,000
  Ronald de Boer -  Barcelona
  Mariano Juan -  Racing, loan
  Michael Laudrup - retired
  Andriy Demchenko -  FC Metalurh Zaporizhya

Results

Champions League

Group stage

References

Notes

AFC Ajax seasons
AFC Ajax